Mini-Spingold national bridge championships are held at the summer American Contract Bridge League (ACBL) North American Bridge Championship (NABC). They were introduced in 2001 and are held at the same time as the main Spingold knockout team championship.

The Mini-Spingold comprises two simultaneous knockout team events. The Mini-Spingold I typically lasts 6 days(5 in 2013) with each day being a round consisting of two sessions of 28 boards. Since 2006 the Mini-Spingold II has been limited to 5 days, so teams may play two matches on the first day.

Mini-Spingold I (0-5000) (before 2017) (0-6000) (starting 2017)
This event is restricted to those with less than 5,000 masterpoints. As of 2017, the masterpoint limit has been raised to 6000.

Mini-Spingold II (0-1500)
This event is restricted to those with less than 1,500 masterpoints. In 2017, the masterpoint limit was raised to 2,500 masterpoints.

References

Sources
List of previous winners, Page 7

2008 Mini-Spingold II winners, Page 1

2008 Mini-Spingold I winners, Page 1

2009 Mini-Spingold II results, Page 16

2009 Mini-Spingold I results, Page 10

Page 3, 

2010 Mini-Spingold I results, Page 12

2011 Mini-Spingold I results, Page 16

2011 Mini-Spingold II results, Page 18

External links
ACBL official website

North American Bridge Championships